Cecil Edward Cole (September 23, 1919 – June 20, 2002) was an American Negro league pitcher in the 1940s.

A native of Connellsville, Pennsylvania, Cole graduated from Connellsville High School in 1937, and served in the US Army during World War II. He played for the Newark Eagles during their 1946 Negro World Series championship season. Cole went on to become a scout for the Pittsburgh Pirates for 35 years. He died in Connellsville in 2002 at age 82.

References

External links
 and Seamheads
 Cecil Cole biography from Society for American Baseball Research (SABR)

1919 births
2002 deaths
Newark Eagles players
Baseball pitchers
Baseball players from Pennsylvania
People from Connellsville, Pennsylvania
Pittsburgh Pirates scouts
United States Army personnel of World War II
20th-century African-American sportspeople
21st-century African-American people